Joseph A. Arnold (born February 26, 1947) is a former American college and professional baseball coach.  During his twenty-four seasons as a head coach, Arnold led the college baseball teams at Florida Southern College, the University of Florida, and Polk State College, and also served as the manager of two Class A minor league teams within the New York Yankees organization.

Early years 

Arnold was born in Daytona Beach, Florida.  He attended Lake Worth High School in Lake Worth, Florida, where he was a pitcher for the Lake Worth Trojans high school baseball team.

Playing career 

He attended Miami-Dade Community College, where he was a standout pitcher for the MDCC baseball team, and was recognized as a junior college All-American in 1966 and 1967.  After he exhausted his junior college eligibility, he transferred to Arizona State University in Tempe, Arizona, where he played for the Arizona State Sun Devils baseball team in 1968.

Following the 1968 college season, the Houston Astros selected Arnold in the third round (55th pick overall) of the 1968 MLB Draft.  He appeared in 114 games while playing for four different Class A affiliates of the Astros in 1968 and 1969; in two seasons, he batted .221 and won his only appearance as a pitcher.

Coaching career 

From 1977 to 1983, Arnold was the head coach of the Florida Southern Moccasins baseball team of Florida Southern College in Lakeland, Florida.  In seven seasons, he led the Mocs baseball team to an overall win–loss record of 316–69 (.821), four Sunshine State Conference (SSC) championships (1980, 1981, 1982, 1983), six consecutive appearances in the Division II College World Series, two Division II national championships (1978, 1981) and two national second-place finishes (1979, 1982).

From 1980 to 1983, Arnold managed the Wareham Gatemen, a collegiate summer baseball team in the prestigious Cape Cod Baseball League.

Arnold was the head coach of the Florida Gators baseball team at the University of Florida in Gainesville, Florida, from 1984 to 1994.  In eleven seasons, Arnold coached the Gators to an overall win–loss record of 434–244–2 (.640), two Southeastern Conference (SEC) championships (1984, 1988), three SEC tournament titles (1984, 1988, 1991), seven appearances in the Division I baseball tournament, and the program's first two appearances in the College World Series (1988, 1991).  He was twice chosen by his fellow coaches as the SEC Coach of the Year (1984, 1988).

Arnold managed the Oneonta Yankees in 1997 and 1998, and the Staten Island Yankees in 1999 and 2000; both teams were the Yankees affiliates in the Class A New York–Penn League.  In four seasons managing Single-A baseball, he compiled a record of 179–119 (.601), his Yankees teams finished first or second in the standings three of four years, and won the league championship twice.  Thereafter, he continued as the director of East Coast scouting for the parent New York Yankees.

Not ready to retire, Arnold became the head coach of his third college baseball team in 2007, accepting the opportunity to coach the Polk State Vikings of Polk State College in Winter Haven, Florida.  He coached the Vikings for four seasons, until health concerns forced him to step down after the 2010 season.

Personal 

Arnold and his wife Beverly have two children, a son and a daughter.

Head coaching record

See also 

 Arizona State Sun Devils
 Florida Gators
 Florida Southern Moccasins
 History of the University of Florida

References 

1947 births
Living people
Baseball coaches from Florida
Arizona State Sun Devils baseball players
Baseball players from Florida
Cocoa Astros players
Cape Cod Baseball League coaches
Florida Gators baseball coaches
Greensboro Patriots players
Miami Dade Sharks baseball players
Peninsula Astros players
Sportspeople from Daytona Beach, Florida
People from Lake Worth Beach, Florida
Williamsport Astros players
National College Baseball Hall of Fame inductees